Gescom is an electronic music project based in the UK with close ties to the electronic duo Autechre.

Stylistically, the music of Gescom is closer to electronic dance music, acid techno, and industrial music than Autechre's, with the exception of a few conceptual remixes (and Minidisc, see below). Notable releases include Key Nell, Minidisc, and ISS:SA.

Members
Sean Booth of Autechre describes Gescom as an umbrella project involving 20 or 30 people. However, since most of their releases are anonymous, the exact roster of the project is not widely known.

 Autechre's debut album, Incunabula, has the motto GESCOM "PLEASURE IS OUR BUSINESS" printed on the spine of the packaging, and thanks Darrell Fitton 4 Gescom in the liner notes.
 Autechre's remix EP Basscad has the motto GESCOM: "PLEASURE IS OUR BUSINESS" printed on the inside spine of the CD, and says Autechre Music Systems from Gescom Transcendental in the liner notes.
 The Gescom EP credits its "conspirators" as Sean Booth and Rob Brown (Autechre), Darrell Fitton (alias Bola), Rob Hall (from Skam Records), and Daniel 72 (a musician and designer near Manchester).
 The Gescom 2 EP credits its "conspirators" as Sean Booth and Rob Brown (Autechre), and Andy Maddocks (from Skam Records).
 The Key Nell EP just says, "Conceived & secreted by Gescom."
 The Keynell remixes EP just says, "Conceived & secreted by Gescom. Additional nurturing & care from Autechre."
 The This EP credits remixes to "Ae" (Autechre), and Velocity Kendall.
 The That EP credits remixes to Tara, Pharoid with Time Chamber, Gescom, and DC Duo's.

Discography

 (1994) Gescom E.P. (sometimes Gescom EP1 or Gescom 1)
 (1994) Gescom 2 (sometimes Gescom EP2 or C & D)
 (1995) The Sounds of Machines Our Parents Used
 (1995) Key Nell
 (1996) Motor
 (1996) Keynell (Autechre remixes)
 (1998) This
 (1998) That
 (1998) Minidisc (sometimes Mini Disc) (album released on MD, later on CD)
 (2003) ISS:SA
 (2007) A1-D1 (released as two 12" EPs and one CD album)
 (2011) Skull Snap
All are EPs, except for Minidisc and A1-D1.

External links
Note: each of the three discographies provides its own additional or erroneous information.
 Complete Gescom discography at Xltronic
 
 Complete Gescom discography at Lycos (fansite)
 Minidisc Distinction, Prix ARS Electronica 2000

British electronic music groups
Intelligent dance musicians